Mỹ Xuyên is a rural district (huyện) of Sóc Trăng province in the Mekong Delta region of Vietnam. As of 2003 the district had a population of 197,876. The district covers an area of 544 km². The district capital lies at Mỹ Xuyên.

References

Districts of Sóc Trăng province